Touch of Death is a martial arts move.

Touch of Death may also refer to:
 Touch of Death (1961 film)
 Touch of Death (Lucio Fulci film), an Italian horror film
 "Touch of Death" (crossover event), a two-part crossover special between Hawaii Five-0 and NCIS: Los Angeles
 Touch of Death (Dungeons & Dragons), an adventure for the Dungeons & Dragons role-playing game